Henry Patterson may refer to:

 Henry Patterson (1929–2022), also Harry, British spy and thriller novelist with the pen name Jack Higgins
Henry A. Patterson (1829–1901), Wisconsin politician
Hank Patterson (baseball) (1907–1970), catcher in Major League Baseball
Henry Patterson (historian), professor of politics at the University of Ulster
Henry Patterson (boxer), opponent of Alfredo Evangelista
Henry Patterson (athlete), in 1999 World Championships in Athletics – Men's high jump

See also
Henry Paterson (born 1997), Australian rugby sevens player